Group D of the 1997 Fed Cup Europe/Africa Zone Group II was one of four pools in the Europe/Africa zone of the 1996 Fed Cup. Six teams competed in a round robin competition, with the top team advancing to Group I for 1998.

Madagascar vs. Malta

Luxembourg vs. Botswana

Liechtenstein vs. Cyprus

Madagascar vs. Cyprus

Malta vs. Liechtenstein

Macedonia vs. Botswana

Malta vs. Luxembourg

Macedonia vs. Cyprus

Liechtenstein vs. Botswana

Madagascar vs. Liechtenstein

Malta vs. Cyprus

Luxembourg vs. Macedonia

Madagascar vs. Luxembourg

Malta vs. Botswana

Macedonia vs. Liechtenstein

Madagascar vs. Macedonia

Luxembourg vs. Liechtenstein

Botswana vs. Cyprus

Madagascar vs. Botswana

Malta vs. Macedonia

Luxembourg vs. Cyprus

  placed first in the pool, and thus advanced to Group I in 1998, where they placed fourth in their group of four and was thus relegated back to Group II for 1999.

See also
Fed Cup structure

References

External links
 Fed Cup website

1997 Fed Cup Europe/Africa Zone